Scott Forbes is an American baseball coach and former player, who is the current head baseball coach of the North Carolina Tar Heels. He played college baseball at Middle Georgia College before transferring in 1994 to North Carolina Wesleyan College where he played for head coach Mike Fox from 1995 to 1997.

Coaching career
In 1999, Forbes followed Fox to Fox's alma mater, North Carolina, to become an assistant coach. He left Chapel Hill to become an assistant coach for the Winthrop Eagles on August 27, 2002. He returned to UNC in 2006, and remained an assistant under Fox for the next 14 years.

North Carolina Head Coach
On August 7, 2020, Fox retired as the head baseball coach of the Tar Heels, and Forbes was named his successor. Forbes' tenure as the Tar Heel head coach got off to a hot start, going 6–0 before suffering their first loss to the Virginia Cavaliers on February 28, 2021. On April 12th, against rival Duke, Forbes' Tar Heels routed the Blue Devils by scoring 21 runs, the most in a game since a win against Virginia Tech in 2013. The Tar Heels ended the season 28–27, finishing tied for third in the ACC Coastal Division. The team made it to the Lubbock Regional of the NCAA Tournament (hosted by Texas Tech University) where they upset UCLA before ultimately being eliminated in the double-elimination bracket.

In his second season, Forbes' Tar Heels got off to another scorching start, compiling a record of 16–2 in the non-conference portion of the schedule. Te Tar Heels soared as high as No. 6 nationally in some polls thanks to their hot hitting and strong pitching to start the year. Centerfielder Vance Honeycutt, the Tar Heels' freshman phenom, excelled early, hitting two home runs in his collegiate debut. However, the Tar Heels began to falter once ACC conference play began in the middle stretch of the season. Despite sweeping Pittsburgh and winning the next series against rivals Duke, the Tar Heels would lose their next five conference series, culminating in a sweep by then 11th ranked Virginia. The month of May saw a dramatic upswing in the Tar Heels' fortunes, and put Forbes' team back in the hunt for a potential NCAA tournament bid. After the Virginia sweep, the Tar Heels won 15 out of their next 17 games, including four straight wins in Charlotte in the ACC Tournament, leaving the Queen City with the ACC Championship and a legitimate chance to host an NCAA Tournament Regional. The Tar Heels beat rivals NC State 9–5 in the championship game to win the crown. The Tar Heels did earn a regional hosting bid, being selected as the No. 10 national seed. The Chapel Hill regional was paired up with the Stillwater Regional and No. 7 national seed Oklahoma State. In the winners' bracket game against VCU, Forbes was ejected and subsequently suspended for two games for arguing a controversial infield fly rule call. While the Heels lost the game, they won three straight games including back-to-back games against VCU. They faced Arkansas in the Chapel Hill super regional where they were swept in two games.

Head coaching record

Personal life
Forbes is married to the former Mandy Passwaters. They have two daughters, one of whom played volleyball at UNC Wilmington. Forbes is a Christian.

See also
 List of current NCAA Division I baseball coaches

References

External links
North Carolina Tar Heels bio

Living people
Middle Georgia Warriors baseball players
North Carolina Wesleyan Battling Bishops baseball players
North Carolina Tar Heels baseball coaches
Winthrop Eagles baseball coaches
American Christians
Year of birth missing (living people)